Leptodactylus griseigularis is a species of frogs in the family Leptodactylidae. It is found in the Amazonian slopes of the Andes in Bolivia and Peru.

Leptodactylus griseigularis inhabit montane primary and lowland tropical moist forests.

References

griseigularis
Amphibians of Bolivia
Amphibians of Peru
Frogs of South America
Amphibians described in 1981
Taxonomy articles created by Polbot